"Réseaux" is a 2017 song by French rapper Niska. It peaked atop in France and Belgium. Its music video has over 320 million views.

Charts

Weekly charts

Year-end charts

Certifications

Remix
Due to its popularity, a remix featuring rappers Stefflon Don and Quavo was released in 2018.

References

2017 singles
2017 songs
Niska (rapper) songs
French-language songs